Donačka Gora is a settlement east of the town of Rogatec in eastern Slovenia. It lies south of a hill with the same name. The area traditionally belonged to the Styria region and is now included in the Savinja Statistical Region.

The local church, from which the hill and the settlement get their name, is dedicated to Saint Donatus and belongs to the Parish of Rogatec. It was built between 1720 and 1730 and vaulted in 1843.

Notable people
Notable people that were born or lived in Donačka Gora include:
 Anton Stres (born 1942), Archbishop of Ljubljana

References

External links
Donačka Gora on Geopedia

Populated places in the Municipality of Rogatec